Krokodil was a satirical magazine published in the Soviet Union. It was founded in 1922 as the satirical supplement to the Workers' Gazette (called simply «Приложения» [Supplement]). When it became a separate publication, the name Crocodile was chosen at an editorial meeting from among a list of suggested animal names. At that time, many satirical magazines existed, such as Zanoza and Prozhektor. Nearly all of them eventually disappeared.

History
Krokodil was founded in 1922, first as a supplement to Rabochaya Gazeta ('Workers' Newspaper'), and was published once a week. Although political satire was dangerous during much of the Soviet period, Krokodil was given considerable license to lampoon political figures and events. Typical and safe topics for lampooning in the Soviet era were the lack of initiative and imagination promoted by the style of an average Soviet middle-bureaucrat, and the problems produced by drinking on the job by Soviet workers.  Krokodil also ridiculed capitalist countries and attacked various political, ethnic and religious groups that allegedly opposed the Soviet system.

Many notable persons contributed to the magazine, including Vladimir Mayakovsky, Mikhail Zoshchenko, Kukriniksy, and Yuliy Ganf.

Similar magazines existed in all the Union republics, and in several ASSRs and in other states of the Soviet bloc, e.g. Starshel ("Wasp") in Bulgaria, Eulenspiegel in East Germany, Urzica ("The Nettle") in Romania, Dikobraz ("Porcupine") in Czechoslovakia, and Szpilki ("Pins") in Poland.

Among the vocal compositions of Dmitri Shostakovich, who is known for his satirical character, there are 5 Romances on texts from Krokodil Magazine (1965), taken from the section of the magazine where were published real-life nonsense texts.

Reinstatement
After the 1991 dissolution of the Soviet Union the magazine was discontinued (2000). It was reinstated in 2005 in Russia, issued monthly, headquartered in Moscow, and with editor-in-chief Sergei Mostovshchikov. The reinstated version, deliberately printed on old Soviet-style paper, ceased publication in 2008.

Editors-in-chief 

 Konstantin Eremeev (1922–23)
 Nikolay Smirnov (1924–27)
 Konstantin Maltsev (1927–28)
 Felix Kohn (1928–30)
 Nikolay Ivanov-Gramen (1928–30)
 Mikhail Manuilsky (1930–34)
 Mikhail Koltsov (1934–38)
 Yakov Rovinsky (1938–41)
 Lazar Lagin (1938–41)
 Grigory Ryklin (1941–48)
 Dmitry Belyaev (1948–53)
 Sergei Shvetsov (1953–58)
 Manuil Semyonov (1958–75)
 Evgeny Dubrovin (1975–85)
 Alexey Pyanov (1986–2000)
 Emil Bondarenko (since 2017)

See also
 Molla Nasraddin,  an Azerbaijani satirical periodical published in the early 20th century.

References

External links

 Archive 1922-2008
 Archive 1935-1991
 Krokodil

1922 establishments in Russia
2006 disestablishments in Russia
Magazines established in 1922
Magazines disestablished in 2008
Magazines published in Moscow
Satirical magazines published in Russia
Russian humour
Magazines published in the Soviet Union
Russian-language magazines